Merizodus is a genus of beetles in the family Carabidae, containing the following species:

 Merizodus angusticollis Solier, 1849
 Merizodus catapileanus Jeannel, 1962
 Merizodus soledadinus (Guerin-Meneville, 1830)

References

Trechinae